Theodoros Zakkas (born 11 December 1965) is a former Greek footballer.

Zakkas played three seasons for Panionios F.C. in the Alpha Ethniki. He also played for Eendracht Aalst and R.A.A. Louviéroise in the Belgian First Division.

Zakkas made three appearances for the Greece national football team during 1989 and 1990.

References

1965 births
Living people
Greek footballers
Greece international footballers
Greek expatriate footballers
Panionios F.C. players
S.C. Eendracht Aalst players
R.A.A. Louviéroise players
Super League Greece players
Belgian Pro League players
Expatriate footballers in Belgium
Association football forwards